Bletsoe is a village and civil parish in Bedfordshire, England. It is on the A6, and about eight miles north of Bedford. The village has a small park, the former site of Bletsoe Castle and a church. Nearby places are Sharnbrook, Milton Ernest, Riseley, Thurleigh, Odell, Souldrop, and Swineshead. The nearest town to Bletsoe is Bedford.

The small hamlet of Bourne End borders Bletsoe and is part of the civil parish. In 1086, Bletsoe parish was within the ancient hundred of Buckelowe. The parish was added to the Hundred of Willey when the ancient hundred was parceled out.

Bletsoe Castle was the birthplace of Margaret Beaufort. She was the mother of Henry VII and grandmother of Henry VIII.

References

External links

Bletsoe pages at the Bedfordshire and Luton Archives and Records Service

Villages in Bedfordshire
Civil parishes in Bedfordshire
Borough of Bedford